Albert Benningk (1637-1695) was a German bellfounder and producer of baroque cannons. He was mainly active at the municipal foundry of the Hanseatic city of Lübeck and in his later life in Copenhagen.

Most famous is his Pulsglocke for St. Mary's Church, Lübeck cast in 1669. It was destroyed during the British air raid on Lübeck in 1942 and since then has served as a war memorial.

His baroque cannons are on exhibit in major army and history museums in Europe, (for example, the Zeughaus in Berlin (Deutsches Historisches Museum), the Tøjhus Museum in Copenhagen, the Legermuseum in Delft, the Artillery Museum in Saint Petersburg and the Museum of Military History, Vienna).

External links 

German sculptors
German male sculptors
Foundrymen
Artists from Lübeck
Bell foundries
Cannon
1637 births
1695 deaths
Musical instrument manufacturing companies of Germany